Sir William Victor McCleery (17 July 1887 – 30 October 1957) was a prominent Unionist in Northern Ireland.

McCleery was the managing director of Hale, Martin and Company, and from 1921 until 1946 was the President of the Ballymoney Chamber of Commerce, from 1922 until 1945 was chair of the North Antrim Agricultural Association, and from 1931 to 1946 was President of the North Antrim Unionist Association. He was also the Grand Master of the Orange Order in County Antrim.

McCleery was elected as the Ulster Unionist Party (UUP) Member of Parliament for North Antrim at a by-election in 1945. In 1949, he briefly served as Minister of Labour, before becoming Minister of Commerce until 1953. In 1949, he was also appointed to the Privy Council of Northern Ireland. After being relieved of his ministerial post, he became chairman of the Unionist Back Bench Committee until 1956. He was knighted in 1954.

McCleery was proposed by James Bailie was a possible candidate for Grand Master of the Orange Institution in Ireland, and following the withdrawal of all the other serious candidates, took up the post in 1954. Still an MP, he used the position to support the UUP Government of Northern Ireland.  The following year, he became Grand Master of the Imperial Grand Orange Council of the World.

References

1887 births
1957 deaths
Members of the House of Commons of Northern Ireland 1945–1949
Members of the House of Commons of Northern Ireland 1949–1953
Members of the House of Commons of Northern Ireland 1953–1958
Northern Ireland Cabinet ministers (Parliament of Northern Ireland)
Members of the Privy Council of Northern Ireland
Ulster Unionist Party members of the House of Commons of Northern Ireland
Knights Bachelor
Grand Masters of the Orange Order
Members of the House of Commons of Northern Ireland for County Antrim constituencies